South Brunswick High School is a high school within the Brunswick County School District in Southport, North Carolina. The  principal is Michael "Chip" Hodges.

The school is currently the smallest of the three traditional high schools in Brunswick County Schools. The Cougars compete in the NCHSAA MEC 3A/4A conference and are the smallest school in the conference. After Hurricane Florence the schools enrollment dipped to below 1,000 students for the first time since the early 2000s. The storm caused students to miss schools for around a month and caused much damage to both the school and the community. The students are known for being the most academically successful in the county. The school has just recently recovered from COVID-19 pandemic and, as of the 2022-2023 school year, removed the majority of COVID-19 restrictions.

Extracurricular activities

Sports 
Football: Varsity and Junior Varsity
Men's Soccer
Women's Soccer
Volleyball
Cheerleading
Men's and Women's Basketball: Varsity and Junior Varsity
Cross Country
Wrestling: Varsity and Junior Varsity
Baseball
Softball
Track and Field 
Men's and Women's Golf
Swim
Lacrosse

Marching band 
The South Brunswick High School Marching Band, known as The Pride of the South Coast Cougar Marching Band, is directed by Michael Palmer. The marching band plays at football games, regional competitions, and local parades in Southport and Wilmington, North Carolina.

Junior ROTC 
The Cougar Battalion is South Brunswick Highschool's JROTC Unit. The Cougar Battalion offers 3 different competition teams; Drill Team, Rifle Team, and Archery Team, all of which compete at regional competitions. The Cougar Battalion is currently instructed by LTC (Ret) Glenn Baker and SFC (Ret) Daniel Corbett. The Cougar Battalion is part of the U.S. Army Cadet Command's 4th Brigade.

Notable alumni
 Quinton McCracken, former MLB player from 1996 to 2005

References

External links
 Official website
 Brunswick County Schools
 South Brunswick Athletic Page

Public high schools in North Carolina
Schools in Brunswick County, North Carolina